Ruppert Stüwe (born 21 May 1978) is a German economist and politician of the Social Democratic Party (SPD) who has been serving as a member of the Bundestag since 2021.

Early life and career
Stüwe was born in 1978 in Berlin and studied economics.

From 2011 to 2021, Stüwe worked for the Berliner Verkehrsbetriebe (BVG).

Political career
Stüwe entered the SPD in 2006 and became a member of the Bundestag in 2021, representing the Berlin-Steglitz-Zehlendorf district.

In parliament, Stüwe has been serving on the Committee on Education, Research and Technology Assessment, the Committee on Petitions, the Subcommittee on Global Health.

Within his parliamentary group, Stüwe belongs to the Parliamentary Left, a left-wing movement.

Other activities
 German Network against Neglected Tropical Diseases (DNTDs), Member of the Parliamentary Advisory Board (since 2022)

References 

Living people
People from Berlin
1978 births
Politicians from Berlin
21st-century German politicians
Members of the Bundestag 2021–2025